Bachtold Glacier is an Antarctic glacier flowing north from Mount Chaudoin, Gonville and Caius Range, into the lower part of Cotton Glacier. The glacier drains the broad slopes between Killer Ridge and Red Ridge. It was named by the Advisory Committee on Antarctic Names after Harry W. Bachtold, US Navy, who at the time was a member of the construction crew which built the original Little America V Station and the original Byrd Station in the 1955–57 pre-IGY period.

See also
 List of glaciers in the Antarctic
 Glaciology

References
 

Glaciers of Scott Coast